TNH may refer to:

 TNH series, the original Czechoslovakian designation of the Panzer 38(t) tank
 Teresa Nielsen Hayden, a science fiction editor, fanzine writer, and essayist
 The New Hampshire, a student newspaper at the University of New Hampshire
 Télévision Nationale d'Haïti, a Haitian-government-owned cultural TV station
 Tonghua Sanyuanpu Airport (IATA code), in Tonghua, China
 Town of North Hempstead, New York